is a Japanese erotic romance yuri manga written by Eiki Eiki and illustrated by Taishi Zaou. It was serialized on Yuri Shimai and Comic Yuri Hime and published in a single volume by Ichijinsha. It was published in English on JManga and in French by Taifu Comics. Two drama CDs were also released.

Characters
Haruka 

Akiho

Fuyuka

Natsuki

Reiko

Ayano

Reception
On manga-news.com, the staff gave it a rating of 15 out of 20. On Manga Sanctuary, one of the staff members gave it a rating of 4 out of 10. On AnimeLand, the staff gave it a rating of "interesting" (4) out of 6. Erica Friedman of Yuricon gave it an overall rating of 8, saying "I don’t think this is their strongest work, but I really did appreciate the skill that went into tying up all the loose ends and making the thing work as a whole".

References

External links

2007 manga
Ichijinsha manga
Lesbian-related comics
Mikiyo Tsuda
Romance anime and manga
Yuri (genre) anime and manga